Colby Burnett is the first Jeopardy! contestant to have won both the Teachers Tournament and the Tournament of Champions. Burnett, who at the time was a teacher at Fenwick High School in Oak Park, Illinois, won the Teachers Tournament in November 2012. Later, in February 2013, Burnett won the show's Tournament of Champions, taking home the $250,000 grand prize. He later appeared on season 3 of TBS's reality game show King of the Nerds. Governor Pat Quinn named December 18 as "Colby Burnett Day" in Illinois.

Education
Burnett graduated from Fenwick High School. He then went on to get his BA from Northwestern University, double majoring in History and Political Science. Then he got his MEd in Reading Teacher Education from Dominican University.

Early life
Burnett grew up in the Austin neighborhood of Chicago. He credits his mother with keeping him out of trouble, as well as enhancing his intellect by buying him an encyclopedia, which he has read from cover to cover. After winning Jeopardy!, Burnett bought his mom a new home in a better area of Chicago. When asked what the greatest accomplishment of his life was, the Jeopardy! champion stated, "knowing a duke of Sealand."

References

External links
Colby Burnett at NACAC
Colby Burnett at Jeopardy! J!Buzz (Sony Pictures)
Colby Burnett at J! Archive

Jeopardy! contestants
Living people
Northwestern University alumni
Participants in American reality television series
People from Chicago
Year of birth missing (living people)
Schoolteachers from Illinois
21st-century American educators